Gert Bestebreurtje is a Dutch Paralympic athlete. He represented the Netherlands at the 1984 Summer Paralympics held in Stoke Mandeville, United Kingdom and New York City, United States. He competed in athletics at the 1984 Summer Paralympics in the men's javelin throw C8 and men's 100 metres C8 events. He won the bronze medal in the men's javelin throw C8 event.

References

External links 
 

Living people
Year of birth missing (living people)
Place of birth missing (living people)
Paralympic bronze medalists for the Netherlands
Paralympic medalists in athletics (track and field)
Athletes (track and field) at the 1984 Summer Paralympics
Medalists at the 1984 Summer Paralympics
Paralympic athletes of the Netherlands
Dutch male sprinters
Dutch male javelin throwers
20th-century Dutch people